José Mario Carrillo Zamudio (born 1 February  1956) is a Mexican former professional footballer and manager, and a commentator for television sports channel ESPN Deportes. He also assisted head coach Javier Aguirre with the Mexico national team.

Carrillo has also coached Club Puebla, Club América, and Cruz Azul.

Playing career

Club
Born in Mexico City, Carrillo played football for Cruz Azul, Atlético Español, Tigres UANL, Deportivo Neza, Oaxtepec, Puebla and Ángeles de Puebla. He was league runner-up with Tigres UANL in 1977–78.

International
Carrillo played for Mexico at the 1976 Summer Olympics in Montreal and won a gold medal in football at the 1975 Pan American Games.

Managerial career
He started coaching on 1 October 1999, with Puebla FC. Later, he worked as an assistant coach for Pumas UNAM, under head coach Hugo Sánchez, becoming champions for two consecutive tournaments. Mario is known for his strong defensive, and fast offensive playing scheme, and always encouraging his players to never give up. He spends long hours studying rivals, hence gaining the nickname of "Capello", in reference to Italian head coach Fabio Capello's skills.

In 2005, Club América won the Mexican Clausura championship under Carrillo management, that being to date his biggest accomplishment.

Later, Carrillo moved to La Liga of Spain to join Javier Aguirre as an assistant coach of Atlético Madrid.

After the FIFA World Cup of South Africa 2010, he returned to Mexico, to manage Pumas UNAM.

Mexico National Team 

He was Assistant Coach of Manuel Lapuente in the Mexico national team during the FIFA World Cup of France, in 1998. 
He was also invited by Javier Aguirre to be his Assistant Coach in the Mexico national team, for the FIFA World Cup South Africa 2010 project.

Clubs as head coach

Titles

As head coach

References

External links

DT Profile at Medio Tiempo

1956 births
Living people
Footballers from Mexico City
Association football defenders
Mexican footballers
Olympic footballers of Mexico
Footballers at the 1976 Summer Olympics
Cruz Azul footballers
Atlético Español footballers
Tigres UANL footballers
Club Puebla players
Mexican football managers
Club Puebla managers
Club América managers
Cruz Azul managers
Tigres UANL managers
Club Universidad Nacional managers
Pan American Games gold medalists for Mexico
Pan American Games medalists in football
Footballers at the 1975 Pan American Games
Medalists at the 1975 Pan American Games